The P865 and P2020 were articulated light rail vehicles used on the Los Angeles County Metro Rail system. They were manufactured by Nippon Sharyo and used on Metro's A Line, C Line (P2020), and E Line.

The trains featured air conditioning, emergency intercoms, wheelchair spaces and automated announcements. They are of an air-electric design, with air powered doors, friction brakes, and a pantograph.

Operational history 
The P865s were the first urban rail vehicles to run in Los Angeles County since the Pacific Electric Railway ceased operations in 1965 as the first cars were delivered in May 1989. The original 54 railcars, numbered 100–153, were ordered at a cost of $1.17 million each. Prior to entering service, all of the railcars were christened after various cities in Los Angeles County; it was in the same style as christening a ship before being launched. Examples include Long Beach (Car 100) and Bell (Car 105).

Nippon Sharyo P2020 
The P2020 was the newer version of the P865, which had automated control panels for Green Line service since the Green Line was originally intended to be fully automated. A total of 15 vehicles with that model designation were delivered to Metro in 1994. The railcars, numbered 154–168, entered revenue service on the Green Line the following year.

In the early 2000s, the railcars were transferred to the Blue Line fleet when the Green Line received newer Siemens P2000 LRVs. As of April 2021, the P2020s were retired due to exceeding the maximum storage capacity after the final batch of the P3010 were delivered. All 15 railcars were retired throughout early 2021. The last railcars were removed from service on April 23, 2021.

Overhaul 
In late 2013, Metro awarded a 60-month fixed price contract to ORX to overhaul the powered axle assemblies for the then twenty-three year old railcars.

Retirement and preservation 
The P865s were completely retired in September 2018 after 28 years of service, and were replaced by Kinki Sharyo P3010s. While most of the P865s were dismantled for parts and subsequently scrapped, Cars 100 and 144 were retained. Car 100, christened Long Beach and painted in the original LACTC livery, is being preserved for its namesake city. Car 144, christened South Gate, was donated to the Southern California Railway Museum in Perris, California. Both cars are currently preserved in operating condition. Car 100 will be placed on static display in Downtown Long Beach.

The P2020s were towed to Division 16 in Westchester throughout early 2021 via the C and K lines. On March 5, P865 Car 100 assisted in the towing operation. Most of the P2020 fleet was later removed and scrapped. P2020 Car 164 will be preserved at the Western Railway Museum in Northern California.

In popular culture 
The P865 has made several media appearances other than public service announcements. It was featured in movies such as Lethal Weapon 3, Virtuosity, The Italian Job, and Captain Marvel.

See also 
 Siemens P2000
 AnsaldoBreda P2550
 Kinki Sharyo P3010
 Los Angeles Metro Rail rolling stock

References

External links 

Los Angeles Metro Rail
Electric multiple units of the United States
750 V DC multiple units
Train-related introductions in 1990
Light rail vehicles
Articulated passenger trains
Nippon Sharyo multiple units